Martha Bucaram Ortiz (b. 12 October 1941, Guayaquil – d. 24 May 1981, Celica) was an Ecuadorian lawyer and feminist who was First Lady of Ecuador to President Jaime Roldós Aguilera, with whom she was killed in a plane crash.

Biography

Martha Bucaram Ortiz was the firstborn child of Lebanese immigrant Jacobo Bucaram Elmhalin and Ecuadorian Rina Ortiz Caicedo, sister of athlete  and future President of Ecuador, Abdalá Bucaram. In 1962, she married Jaime Roldós Aguilera and gave birth to three children. Her firstborn daughter, Martha Roldós, has entered politics and became a deputy in the Ethics and Democracy Network party.

First Lady of Ecuador
When Jaime Roldós Aguilera assumed the Presidency of Ecuador, Bucaram became the First Lady and assumed the traditional office of president of the National Institute for Children and the Family.

As a feminist, Bucaram fought for changes to the Civil Code of Ecuador that would expand the role of women in Ecuadorian society. As First Lady, she created the Office of Women, attached to the Presidency since 1980.

Death

On Sunday, May 24, 1981 a Beechcraft Super King Air, carrying the President and an entourage to a military ceremony in honor of the fallen in the Paquisha War, crashed into Huairapungo Hill, near the town of Guachanamá, in the Celica Canton of Loja Province. The crash, at 2360 meters over sea level (7800 ft.), left no survivors: killed were the president, his wife, the Minister of Defense Marco Subía Martinez and his wife, two aides-de-camp, a flight attendant and both pilots. The bodies were reportedly burned beyond recognition.

Citations

1941 births
1981 deaths
Ecuadorian people of Lebanese descent
First ladies of Ecuador
Ecuadorian women lawyers
Ecuadorian feminists
Victims of aviation accidents or incidents in Ecuador
Victims of aviation accidents or incidents in 1981
20th-century women lawyers